Saadatabad-e Vasat (also Romanized as Sa‘ādatābād-e Vasaţ; also known as Sa‘ādatābād, Sa‘ādatābād-e Baghal, Sa‘adatābād-e Baghalī, Sa‘ādatābād-e Vosţā, Sa‘ādatābād-e Vosţá, and Sa‘adat Abad Khafrak) is a village in Rahmat Rural District, Seyyedan District, Marvdasht County, Fars Province, Iran. At the 2006 census, its population was 472, in 121 families.

References 

Populated places in Marvdasht County